Jonas Kühn (born 20 March 2002) is a German footballer who plays as a left midfielder or left back for Viktoria Berlin.

Early life
Kühn was born in Plauen.

Career
Having played youth football with VFC Plauen, Kühn joined Dynamo Dresden's youth team in 2018. In December 2020, he signed a professional contract with the club, active from summer 2021. He made his debut for the club as a substitute in a 3–0 3. Liga defeat at home to Hallescher FC on 24 April 2021. In August 2021, he joined Sonnenhof Großaspach on loan for the 2021–22 season.

References

External links

Living people
2002 births
German footballers
People from Plauen
Footballers from Saxony
Association football wingers
Association football fullbacks
VFC Plauen players
Dynamo Dresden players
SG Sonnenhof Großaspach players
FC Viktoria 1889 Berlin players
3. Liga players
Regionalliga players